Captain Torgil Vilhelm Hildebad Thorén (30 March 1892 – 11 March 1982) was a Swedish Navy officer, and the first chief of the National Defence Radio Establishment (FRA).

Biography 
Torgil Thorén was born on 30 March 1892 in Döderhult, Sweden, the son of medical doctor Adolf Thorén and Anna (née Björck). Thorén was commissioned as an officer in the Swedish Navy with the rank of underlöjtnant in 1912. He was promoted to sub-lieutenant in 1916, lieutenant in 1922, lieutenant commander in 1937, and to commander in 1939. In 1942 he was appointed captain.

He studied at the Royal Swedish Naval Staff College from 1919 to 1920, and then attended the torpedo course there. In 1922-1935, Thorén was a torpedo boat and destroyer captain. After that, he received a position as division commander in the Destroyer Division (Jagardivisionen), but before World War II erupted as head of department at the Naval Staff and, subsequently, at the Defence Staff (1938-1942). In 1942, he ended up at the National Defence Radio Establishment (FRA) as its first chief, he became the chief executive officer and head in 1952, until retirement in 1957.

His relationship with the Finnish intelligence was the key to Operation Stella Polaris

He wrote about his time at the FRA in 1945.

Personal life
In 1920, he married Ingrid Mathiesen (born 1899), the daughter of Halfdan Mathiesen and Olga Breien. They had two children; Rolf (born 1922) and Gösta (born 1924).

Dates of rank
1912 – Underlöjtnant
1916 – Sub-lieutenant
1922 – Lieutenant
1937 – Lieutenant commander
1939 – Commander
1942 – Captain

Awards and decorations
Thorén's awards:

Swedish
   Commander 1st Class of the Order of the Sword (6 June 1963)
   Knight of the Order of the Polar Star
   Knight of the Order of Vasa
  RGM
  KSHstorpk

Foreign
   Commander of the Order of St. Olav (1 July 1957)
   2nd Class of the Order of the Cross of Liberty with swords
   Knight 1st Class of the Order of the White Rose of Finland
   Officer of the Order of the Three Stars
   Officer of the Order of Polonia Restituta
   Officer of the Order of the German Eagle
   King Haakon VII Freedom Cross

Honours
Member of the Royal Swedish Society of Naval Sciences (1931)

References

1892 births
1982 deaths
Swedish Navy captains
Swedish civil servants
People from Oskarshamn Municipality
Commanders First Class of the Order of the Sword
Knights of the Order of Vasa
Knights of the Order of the Polar Star
Members of the Royal Swedish Society of Naval Sciences